Mbali Ngiba, is a South African actress and singer.

Career
In 2013, she made television debut with the role of "Linda" in the Mzansi Magic anthology miniseries Abangani. In the same year, she acted in the direct-to-video film The Right with the role "Zodwa". Then she did a cameo role in the SABC1 soapie Generations. In 2016, she joined with the Mzansi Magic telenovela Greed & Desire and played the role "Welile". After that, she played the minor role of "Emergency Nurse" in the e.tv drama Easy Money. In 2018, she joined with the second season of Mzansi Magic telenovela Isithembiso to play the role "Buhle". In the same year, she made the minor role "Lab Technician" in another Mzansi Magic telenovela The River. In 2020, she appeared in the etv. medical drama Durban Gen with the role of "Mrs Mthembu".

Filmography

References

External links
 IMDb

Living people
South African film actresses
South African television actresses
Year of birth missing (living people)